Pok Fu Lam Country Park is located on Pok Fu Lam, the western end of the Southern District of Hong Kong Island. The 270-hectare park was designated in 1979.

Ecology
The park is located at the foot of Mount Victoria. Since being declared a park, the Department of Agriculture and Fisheries has engaged in efforts to green the valley. Many non-native species have been planted over the years such as Slash Pine, Formosa Acacia and Brisbane Box, as well as native trees including Hong Kong Gordonia and Chekiang Machilus.

Facilities
The park includes:

Sylvan sanctuary
Pok Fu Lam Reservoir (1863)
Hong Kong Trail
Peak Trail

See also
Aberdeen Country Park
Tai Tam Country Park

External links

Pok Fu Lam Country Park

References

Country parks and special areas of Hong Kong
Pok Fu Lam
1979 establishments in Hong Kong